Rubricacaecilia is an extinct genus of caecilian (limbless amphibian) from the Berriasian aged Ksar Metlili Formation in Morocco.

References

Gymnophiona
Early Cretaceous amphibians of Africa
Fossil taxa described in 2001
Prehistoric amphibian genera
Berriasian genera